{{DISPLAYTITLE:C15H11O4}}
The chemical compound C15H11O4 (or C15H11O4+, molar mass : 255.24 g/mol, exact mass: 255.065734) may refer to:
 Apigeninidin, an anthocyanidin
 Guibourtinidin, an anthocyanidin